Lake Josephine may refer to:
Lake Josephine (Florida), a natural freshwater lake in Highlands County, Florida
Lake Josephine (Ramsey County, Minnesota)
Lake Josephine (Montana), a natural freshwater lake in Glacier National Park, Montana
Lake Josephine (Western Australia), a lake of Western Australia

See also
 Josephine Lake, in the Alpine Lakes Wilderness, Washington